Yedineniye ("Unification") is Australia's oldest Russian newspaper, published weekly since 1950, and is one of the five oldest Russian newspapers abroad. It is published in West Ryde, New South Wales.

External links
Website

1950 establishments in Australia
Publications established in 1950
European-Australian culture in New South Wales
Newspapers published in New South Wales
Russian-Australian culture
Russian-language newspapers published in Australia
Weekly newspapers published in Australia
Non-English-language newspapers published in Australia